Abeele Aerodrome Military Cemetery is a Commonwealth War Graves Commission (CWGC) burial ground for the dead of the First World War located in the Ypres Salient on the Western Front.

The cemetery grounds were assigned to the United Kingdom in perpetuity by King Albert I of Belgium in recognition of the sacrifices made by the British Empire in the defence and liberation of Belgium during the war.

Foundation

The cemetery, at Abele in Belgium but metres from the border with France, was founded by French troops in April 1918, receiving Commonwealth and American burials between July and September 1918.

After the Armistice, the French and American graves were concentrated at other cemeteries, leaving just Commonwealth burials. These were increased by concentrating 25 graves from the nearby Boeschepe churchyard in France.

The cemetery is named for the wartime aerodrome established in nearby fields although the cemetery itself contains no Royal Air Force graves.

The cemetery was designed by G. H. Goldsmith, who also designed Orient House in Manchester.

Notable graves
Reference works point to two unusual inscriptions on gravestones in this cemetery. One asks the poignant question "Old Pal, why don’t you answer me", whilst another, less unusually, is in Welsh and reads "Arglwydd Dangos Ini Tad Digon Yw Ini".

References

External links
 
 wo1.be
 

Commonwealth War Graves Commission cemeteries in Belgium